Big Brother Panto is a special series of Big Brother that brought together ten housemates from previous Big Brothers to produce the pantomime Cinderella. It aired from 20 December 2004 to 5 January 2005 on the Channel 4 network.

The pantomime performed, Cinderella, was written by Jonathan Harvey, who wrote the sitcom Gimme Gimme Gimme.

Broadcasts
Big Brother Panto aired from 20 December 2004 to 5 January 2005 and was presented by Jeff Brazier. It was broadcast each night on E4 at 10pm and repeated the following morning the T4 slot on Channel 4. On 28 December there was a live show on E4 at 11am where comments and suggestions from the public were read to the housemates. The finale aired at 9pm on E4.

The housemates went home twice, firstly from 23 to 27 December and secondly from 30 December to 3 January to spend Christmas and New Year at home. Unlike all other Big Brother series, there were no evictions and no winner.  The only public vote was for who played Cinderella.

On 27 December, Channel 4 accidentally broadcast the first half of the late-night E4 show, containing adult language and content, pre-watershed on T4. They later apologised.

House
The housemates spent the duration of the series in "The Lodge". There was a kitchen, bedroom, diary room, and a great hall. The Lodge was located in Bristol Studios.

Housemates
Ten former Big Brother housemates took part. From Big Brother 1 were Nick Bateman and Melanie Hill, from series two was Narinder Kaur, from Big Brother 3 was Tim Culley, Jade Goody and Spencer Smith, from the fourth series was Anouska Golebiewski and the fifth series' was represented by Victor Ebuwa, Kitten Pinder and Marco Sabba. The housemates were paid for appearing.

In addition to the housemates, there were coach and staff to train them for the pantomime. The director was Chris Denys, the dance coach was Louie Spence and the dame coach was Dave Lynn. The stage manager was Ruth and the voice coaches were Mike and Nick.

Daily summary

References

External links
Big Brother Panto at Channel4.com

2004 British television seasons
2005 British television seasons
UK
Pantomime